Ri Hyok-chol (born 27 January 1991) is a North Korean international football player who currently plays for Rimyongsu.

International

International goals 
Scores and results list North Korea's goal tally first, score column indicates score after each North Korea goal.

References

1991 births
Living people
North Korean footballers
North Korea youth international footballers
North Korea international footballers
Asian Games medalists in football
Footballers at the 2014 Asian Games
2019 AFC Asian Cup players
Expatriate footballers in Cambodia
North Korean expatriate footballers
Asian Games silver medalists for North Korea
Association football forwards
Medalists at the 2014 Asian Games